The Le Brethon was Kenney-class gunboat of the French Navy. She served in the Far East, notably during the French campaign against Korea of 1866.

Career 
Started as Aigrette upon plans by engineer Verny, using a steam engine cannibalised from Salve, the ship was renamed Le Brethon on 25 September 1863, after Lieutenant Albert Édouard Le Brethon de Caligny.

Le Brethon was commissioned in Shanghai on 9 November 1864 and appointed to the Cochinchina Division. Decommissioned on 1 June 1865, she was reactivated on 1 March 1866 and took part in the French campaign against Korea under Huché de Cintré.

Notes, citations, and references
Notes

Citations

References

Ships built in France
1864 ships
Gunboats of the French Navy